Paul Lamont Shields Jr. (born January 31, 1976) is a former American football running back who played two seasons with the Indianapolis Colts of the National Football League. He first enrolled at Scottsdale Community College before transferring to the University of Arizona. He was also a member of the Arizona Cardinals and Kansas City Chiefs.

Professional career

Indianapolis Colts
Shields was a member of the Indianapolis Colts from 1999 to 2001. He was not offered a tender by the Colts in 2001.

Arizona Cardinals
Shields signed with the Arizona Cardinals on May 21, 2001. He was released by the Cardinals on September 2, 2001.

Kansas City Chiefs
Shields was signed by the Kansas City Chiefs on January 16, 2002. He was released by the Chiefs on September 1, 2002.

Personal life

Currently Paul Shields has 3 kids. He is an Entrepreneur and a Philanthropist.

References

External links
Just Sports Stats

Living people
1976 births
Players of American football from Maryland
American football running backs
African-American players of American football
Scottsdale Fighting Artichokes football players
Arizona Wildcats football players
Indianapolis Colts players
People from Camp Springs, Maryland
21st-century African-American sportspeople
20th-century African-American sportspeople